Frederick Claude Vivian Lane (2 February 1880 – 14 May 1969) was an Australian swimmer who competed at the 1900 Summer Olympics.

Lane, from Manly, New South Wales, was four years old when his brother saved him from drowning in Sydney Harbour, whereupon he decided to learn to swim. Later, he attended high school at Saint Ignatius' College, Riverview.

After breaking many Australasian swimming records, Lane moved to England to compete in the English Championships in 1899.

He was the first Australian to represent his country in swimming at the Olympic Games, when he competed at the 1900 Summer Olympics in Paris, and won two gold medals. He first won the 200 metres freestyle, clearly beating Hungarian Zoltán Halmay. His second final was just 45 minutes later, the discontinued 200 metre obstacle event, where he beat Austrian Otto Wahle.

After the Olympics, Lane stayed in England for another two years working for a legal firm in Blackpool while he continued to swim and break records. In July 1902, he won a 100-yard race and became the first person to record one minute dead for that distance. In August, he swam 220 yards in 2 minutes 28.6 seconds, which in 1974 was ratified by FINA as the first World Record for 200 metres. In October, he broke the one-minute barrier for 100 yards in 59.6 seconds.

On returning to Australia, Lane became a master printer and a partner in a printing and stationery firm on Bridge Street, Sydney. He married in 1908. He died in 1969 at Avalon, New South Wales.

In 1969, Lane was honoured by the International Swimming Hall of Fame in Fort Lauderdale, Florida.

On 10 December 1985, Lane was inducted into the Sport Australia Hall of Fame. In 2022, he was an inaugural inductee of the Swimming Australia Hall of Fame.

See also
 List of members of the International Swimming Hall of Fame
 List of Olympic medalists in swimming (men)
 World record progression 200 metres freestyle

References

External links
 

1880 births
1969 deaths
Australian male freestyle swimmers
Olympic swimmers of Australia
Olympic gold medalists for Australia
Swimmers at the 1900 Summer Olympics
People educated at Sydney Grammar School
World record setters in swimming
Medalists at the 1900 Summer Olympics
Olympic gold medalists in swimming
Sport Australia Hall of Fame inductees